Wang Zhiming may refer to:

Wang Zhiming (pastor) (1907–1973), Chinese pastor and martyr
Wang Zhiming (fencer) (born 1964), Chinese fencer
Wang Zhiming (athlete), Chinese field athlete

See also
Wang Zhimin, (born 1957), Chinese politician
Wang Ziming